La Salle School, Klang is a boys' mission school in Klang, Selangor, Malaysia. It is located at Persiaran Raja Muda Musa, Klang and neighbours three other schools: Hin Hua High School (Private), SMK Tengku Ampuan Rahimah, and SK (1)&(2) Simpang lima.

History
La Salle School, Klang is one of the oldest schools in Klang. It was established by the Roman Catholic Church in 1940 to provide education for Malayan boys regardless of race and religious affiliation. It is one of 26 De La Salle mission schools in Malaysia. The primary and secondary schools were administered as a single unit until 1964.

Private  school
Rev. Father Louis Guittart of France was the first principal of the school. The school was originally known as St. Bernadette's School but was renamed La Salle Institution in 1950 when the school was placed under the administration of the De La Salle Brothers, a teaching congregation with schools and universities across the world. In 1952, the school was renamed La Salle School. Today, the primary school is formally known in Malay as Sekolah Kebangsaan La Salle and the secondary school is formally known as Sekolah Menengah Kebangsaan La Salle. They are now both national schools administered by the Malaysian Ministry of Education but remain under the ownership of the Archdiocese of Kuala Lumpur which appoints members of the school's Board of Governors. Like  all Malaysian "English-medium"  missionary   schools, the payment of  fees for  primary and  secondary  school   students  at  La  Salle was required  until  the  school  fully integrated  a  "Malay-medium language  instruction"  which  it  had  by the 1980s.

The school was headed by a Brother Director of the De La Salle Brothers until 1989 when Rex C.C. Michael became the first principal not of consecrated life. The last Brother Director to serve the school was the Rev. Bro. Michael Wong FSC. The students and alumni of La Salle School, Klang call themselves 'Lasallians'. The school motto, 'Lux Luceat Vobis' is Latin for 'let your light shine' (Matthew 5:16). The school anthem is "All Through Our Classes" while "Hail Alma Mater" is used as the prefects' anthem. The school sports houses are Celestine, Harold, Leo, Edmund and Philip. Alumni of the school are represented by the Old Lasallian Association of Klang (OLAK).

Principals

See also
 Persiaran Raja Muda Musa
 SMK Tengku Ampuan Rahimah, Klang
 SK Simpang Lima, Klang
 Hin Hua High School Klang

References

Schools in Selangor
Educational institutions established in 1940
1940 establishments in British Malaya
Lasallian schools in Malaysia
Catholic schools in Malaysia
Primary schools in Malaysia
Secondary schools in Malaysia
Boys' schools in Malaysia